"King of the Mountain" is a song by Australian rock band Midnight Oil released in 1990 as the third single from their album Blue Sky Mining. It peaked at No. 25 on the Australian Singles Chart, No. 3 on the Billboard Modern Rock Chart and No. 20 on the Billboard Album Rock Chart.

The music video was partly filmed in front of the Exxon Building in Manhattan, New York City. This portion of the video shows the band performing in front of a banner that reads “Midnight Oil makes you dance, Exxon oil makes us sick.”

Background
Although many people think the song is a reference to Peter Brock and the Bathurst 1000 held at Mount Panorama, drummer Rob Hirst confirmed the song is actually inspired by the footrace up Mount Cooroora and the surrounding natural beauty and unique history of the Noosa hinterland.

Track listing

Charts

References

1990 singles
1990 songs
Midnight Oil songs
Columbia Records singles
Songs written by Rob Hirst
Songs written by Jim Moginie
Songs written by Peter Garrett
Songs written by Martin Rotsey
Songs written by Bones Hillman